The 2011–2012 figure skating season began on July 1, 2011, and ends on June 30, 2012. During this season, elite skaters competed on the ISU Championship level at the 2012 European, Four Continents, World Junior, and World Championships. They also competed in elite events such as the Grand Prix series and Junior Grand Prix series, culminating in the Grand Prix Final.

Season notes 
On September 26, 2011, American Brandon Mroz landed a quad Lutz in the short program at the 2011 Colorado Springs Invitational. The U.S. Figure Skating-sanctioned competition was a small non-ISU event with three men's entries, making it unclear whether the accomplishment would be recognized by the International Skating Union. In October, the ISU announced it had ratified the jump as the first quad Lutz to be performed in a sanctioned competition. World Champion Patrick Chan of Canada commented, "I don't think it can be an official ISU record until [Mroz] has done it in an ISU event." On November 12, Mroz landed it in the short program at 2011 NHK Trophy, becoming the first skater to land it in an international competition.

Between seasons, the ISU sometimes adjusts elements' base values and/or grades of execution. On December 28, 2011, the ISU announced it had discovered that the calculation program had not been updated with a new GOE introduced in July. The ISU explained: "The calculation program used up to and including the ISU Grand Prix of Figure Skating Final had erroneously calculated the Dance result with the previous Grade of Execution (GOE) for the Combination Lift, which was upgraded with ISU Communication 1677 in July 2011." The error affected the free dance results at the Grand Prix Final, with Tessa Virtue and Scott Moir winning the segment instead of Meryl Davis and Charlie White, however, Davis and White remained in first place overall due to their lead from the short dance.

In December 2011, the International Skating Union released details of the team figure skating event at the 2014 Winter Olympics.

Age eligibility 
Skaters competing on the junior level were required to be at least 13 but not 19 – or 21 for male pair skaters and ice dancers – before July 1, 2011. Those who had turned 14 were eligible for the senior Grand Prix series and senior B internationals. Those who turned 15 before July 1, 2011 were also eligible for the senior World, European, and Four Continents Championships.

Minimum scores 
Minimum score requirements were added to the senior Grand Prix series, following on requirements introduced in the previous season to the European, Four Continents, and World Championships. The Grand Prix minimums were set at two-thirds of the top scores at the 2011 World Championships. Prior to competing in a senior Grand Prix event, skaters were required to have earned the following:

The International Skating Union decided minimums were not required for "host picks", i.e. Canadians Adriana DeSanctis and Elladj Balde were allowed to compete at their home country's event, 2011 Skate Canada, despite failing to reach the minimums at the 2011 Nebelhorn Trophy.

Music

Partnership changes 
Some skaters announced the dissolution of a partnership or formation of a new one. Listed are changes involving at least one partner who competed at Worlds, Europeans, Four Continents, Junior Worlds or the senior Grand Prix, or who medaled on the Junior Grand Prix circuit.

Coaching changes

Retirements

Competitions 
The following competitions were scheduled in the 2011–2012 figure skating season.
Key

International medalists

Men

Ladies

Pairs

Ice dance

Season's best scores
Top scores according to the ISU Season's Best standings. All scores are from ISU Championships (World, European, Four Continents, Junior World) or the Grand Prix series (both senior and junior), except for skaters who have no such assignments. In the latter case, a score from another international event may be included with an asterisk. As of April 21, 2012:

Men

Ladies

Pairs

Ice dance

Standings and ranking

Season-end standings (top 30)

Men's singles

Ladies' singles

Pairs

Ice dance

Season's ranking (top 30)

Men's singles

Ladies' singles

Pairs

Ice dance

References 

Seasons in figure skating
2011 in figure skating
2012 in figure skating